Stress (stage name; actually Andres Andrekson; born on 25 July 1977 in Tallinn, Estonia) is Estonian-Swiss hip hop singer.

He left from Estonia in 1989.

Discography

Albums
2003 "Billy Bear"
2005 "25.07.03"
2006 "Renaissance"
2009 "Des rois, des pions et des fous"

Filmography
2004 "Redemption – Früchte des Zorns"
2007 "Breakout"
2009 "Verso"

References

External links

1977 births
Living people
Swiss hip hop musicians